Thiago da Rosa Corrêa (born April 7, 1982), known as Thiago, Thiago Gaúcho or Thiago Corrêa, is a Brazilian footballer, who plays for São Luiz.

Biography
Thiago joined the youth program of his local club Sport Club Internacional at the age of 12. He made his professional debut with the club in 2003,  before moving to Ginásio Pinhalense de Esportes Atléticos the following year. He had a trial with Chicago Fire in the summer of 2004 and joined the club before the 2005 MLS season. Thiago had a successful debut campaign, scoring six goals and seven assists. Thiago was released by the Fire in September 2007.

He returned to Brazil in 2008 with Campeonato Paulista side Sertãozinho before moving to União de Leiria in Portuguese Liga de Honra that same year.  After just two games he returned to Brazil with Campeonato Gaúcho side Ulbra. He joined Porto Alegre in June 2009 for 2009 Campeonato Gaúcho Segunda Divisão. Thiago played at 2010 Campeonato Gaúcho, which he scored 3 goal in 10 appearances before moving to Caxias do Sul. He played once in 2010 Campeonato Brasileiro Série C, on August 15, replacing Marcelo Costa at half time.

Honours
U.S. Open Cup: 2006
Campeonato Gaúcho Segunda Divisão: 2009

References

External links
 
 Portuguese Liga Profile
 CBF 

Brazilian footballers
Brazilian expatriate footballers
Sport Club Internacional players
Chicago Fire FC players
Sertãozinho Futebol Clube players
U.D. Leiria players
Canoas Sport Club players
Porto Alegre Futebol Clube players
Sociedade Esportiva e Recreativa Caxias do Sul players
Expatriate soccer players in the United States
Expatriate footballers in Portugal
Association football midfielders
Footballers from Porto Alegre
1982 births
Living people
Major League Soccer players